Newtons Sleep is an original novel by Daniel O'Mahony set in the Faction Paradox universe.

It is the only Faction Paradox novel to be published by Random Static. Although taking place in a shared universe, it is a stand-alone work that does not require any prior knowledge of Faction Paradox. The events of Newtons Sleep occur on Earth in the 17th century. One of the central characters of the book is the historical playwright and spy Aphra Behn.

The lack of an apostrophe in the title is intentional, and alludes to both Finnegans Wake and the original punctuation of the William Blake quote from which it is drawn:

Blake is objecting to the literalism of the Newtonian mindset. He would have us see multiple significances in everything.

On 16 January 2009, Random Static released a free e-book edition of Newtons Sleep in pdf format.

Awards
The cover art, by Emma Weakley won the Sir Julius Vogel Award (New Zealand science fiction and fantasy award) for Best Artwork in 2009.

References

External links
 
Random Static
Free E-book Edition

Faction Paradox
2008 British novels
2008 science fiction novels
British science fiction novels
Novels by Daniel O'Mahony
Free ebooks